TV Eyes is an American synthpop group, consisting of Jason Falkner, Roger Joseph Manning Jr. and Brian Reitzell.

They released their self-titled debut album in November 2006 in Japan, and re-released it internationally in 2014.

An EP entitled Softcore was released on July 2, 2008, in Japan.

References

External links
 

American electronic music groups